Symplocos pluribracteata is a species of plant in the family Symplocaceae. It is endemic to Ecuador.  Its natural habitat is subtropical or tropical dry shrubland.

References

Endemic flora of Ecuador
pluribracteata
Endangered plants
Taxonomy articles created by Polbot